Augusta Andersson (1856-1938) was a Swedish businessperson. 

Known as "Pretty Augusta", she was from 1876 employed, from 1894 the manager and from 1901 to 1931 the owner of the restaurant Restaurant 55:an ('Restaurant Number 55'); originally a pastry coffee house, she developed it into a well-known restaurant known for its high standards and for being the locality of the arts club Kägelklubben Klothilda, which famously included Anders Zorn.

References

1938 deaths
Swedish restaurateurs
19th-century Swedish businesspeople
20th-century Swedish businesspeople
20th-century Swedish businesswomen
19th-century Swedish businesswomen